The 2003 Crown Prince Cup was the 28th season of the Saudi premier knockout tournament since its establishment in 1957. It started with the qualifying rounds on 9 January 2003 and concluded with the final on 9 April 2003.

In the final, Al-Hilal defeated defending champions Al-Ahli 1–0 to secure their fourth title. The final was held at the King Fahd International Stadium in Riyadh. As winners of the tournament, Al-Hilal qualified for the 2004 AFC Champions League group stage.

Qualifying rounds
All of the competing teams that are not members of the Premier League competed in the qualifying rounds to secure one of 4 available places in the Round of 16. The qualifying competition began on 9 January 2003. First Division sides Abha, Al-Ansar, and Al-Taawoun as well as Second Division side Al-Nahda qualified.

First round

Second round

Final Round

Bracket

Round of 16
The Round of 16 fixtures were played on 19 and 20 March 2003. All times are local, AST (UTC+3).

Quarter-finals
The Quarter-finals fixtures were played on 24 and 25 March 2003. All times are local, AST (UTC+3).

Semi-finals
The Semi-finals fixtures were played on 28 and 29 March 2003. All times are local, AST (UTC+3).

Final
The 2003 Crown Prince Cup Final was played on 9 April 2003 at the King Fahd International Stadium in Riyadh. This was the fourth Crown Prince Cup final to be held at the stadium. This was the first meeting between these two sides in the final. All times are local, AST (UTC+3).

Top goalscorers

See also
 2002–03 Saudi Premier League
 2004 AFC Champions League

References

Saudi Crown Prince Cup seasons
2003 domestic association football cups
Crown Prince Cup